Meiopriapulus is a genus of worms belonging to the family Tubiluchidae.

The species of this genus are found in Southeastern Asia.

Species:
 Meiopriapulus fijiensis Morse, 1981

References

Priapulida